The 1964 Rhode Island gubernatorial election was held on November 3, 1964. Incumbent Republican John Chafee defeated Democratic nominee Edward P. Gallogly with 61.15% of the vote.

Primary elections
Primary elections were held on September 17, 1964.

Democratic primary

Candidates
Edward P. Gallogly, incumbent Lieutenant Governor
Alexander R. Walsh
John L. Rego

Results

General election

Candidates
John Chafee, Republican
Edward P. Gallogly, Democratic

Results

References

1964
Rhode Island
Gubernatorial